Yohan Tavares (born 2 March 1988) is a professional footballer who plays as a central defender for French  club Stade Lavallois.

Over ten seasons, he amassed Portuguese Primeira Liga totals of 244 matches and five goals for Beira-Mar, Estoril, Vitória de Setúbal, Tondela and Belenenses SAD. He also competed professionally in his birth nation, Belgium, Thailand and Cyprus.

Born in France, Tavares represented Portugal at youth level.

Club career

Beira-Mar
Tavares was born in Tours, France. After an unassuming spell with Le Mans FC – he only appeared officially with the reserve team – he returned to the land of his parents and joined S.C. Beira-Mar, signing a four-year contract following a successful trial period. He suffered a ligament injury to his right knee in December 2008, going on to be sidelined for several months.

In his second season, Tavares contributed 13 games (eight starts) as the Aveiro club returned to the Primeira Liga after three years. He made his debut in the competition on 15 August 2010 in a 0–0 home draw against U.D. Leiria, and finished the campaign with 21 matches, scoring in a 1–1 home draw with Rio Ave F.C. as his team finally ranked 13th, out of the relegation zone.

Standard Liège
In the 2012 summer transfer window, Tavares signed with Standard Liège of the Belgian Pro League for a reported fee of €2 million, agreeing to a three-year deal. He made the first of only three competitive appearances for his new team on 30 September, playing the full 90 minutes in a 2–1 away loss to K.V. Kortrijk.

Estoril
On 26 July 2013, after having spent the latter part of the season on loan at the club, and after having cancelled his contract with A.C. ChievoVerona, Tavares joined G.D. Estoril Praia on a three-year deal. He started in all his league matches during his spell at the Estádio António Coimbra da Mota, and added 16 in the UEFA Europa League, his first being on 1 August 2013 in a 0–0 home draw against Hapoel Ramat Gan Givatayim F.C. in the third qualifying round– his only goal took place on 23 October of the following year, in a 1–2 group stage defeat to FC Dynamo Moscow.

Later years
On 21 November 2016, free agent Tavares moved to the Thai League 1 with Bangkok United FC. After a three-month stint back in his country with Vitória de Setúbal, he signed with Cypriot club APOEL FC on 23 May 2018.

Tavares returned to his native France ten years after leaving, joining Troyes AC of Ligue 2 for two seasons. He left after only one, however, moving back to Portugal and its top division with C.D. Tondela.

On 30 August 2021, Tavares signed a one-year contract with Belenenses SAD of the same league. The following July, having been relegated, the 34-year-old returned to the French second tier with Stade Lavallois.

International career
On 19 May 2011, during the final of the International Challenge Trophy against England C played in Northampton, Tavares celebrated his debut for the Portugal under-23 team by scoring the game's only goal.

Career statistics

Honours
Beira-Mar
Segunda Liga: 2009–10

References

External links

1988 births
Living people
French people of Portuguese descent
Sportspeople from Tours, France
French footballers
Portuguese footballers
Footballers from Centre-Val de Loire
Association football defenders
Ligue 2 players
Le Mans FC players
ES Troyes AC players
Stade Lavallois players
Primeira Liga players
Liga Portugal 2 players
S.C. Beira-Mar players
G.D. Estoril Praia players
Vitória F.C. players
C.D. Tondela players
Belenenses SAD players
Belgian Pro League players
Standard Liège players
Yohan Tavares
Yohan Tavares
APOEL FC players
Portuguese expatriate footballers
Expatriate footballers in Belgium
Expatriate footballers in Thailand
Expatriate footballers in Cyprus
Portuguese expatriate sportspeople in Belgium
Portuguese expatriate sportspeople in Thailand
Portuguese expatriate sportspeople in Cyprus